The Bulgarian Federation of Radio Amateurs (BFRA; Bulgarian: Българската федерация на радиолюбителите) is a national non-profit organization for amateur radio enthusiasts in Bulgaria.

Key membership benefits of the BFRA include the sponsorship of amateur radio operating awards, radio contests, and a QSL bureau for members who regularly communicate with amateur radio operators in other countries.  BFRA represents the interests of Bulgarian amateur radio operators before Bulgarian and international telecommunications regulatory authorities.

BFRA is the national member society representing Bulgaria in the International Amateur Radio Union.  BFRA was the host organization for the 2006 Amateur Radio Direction Finding World Championships.

See also 
 International Amateur Radio Union

References 

Bulgaria
Clubs and societies in Bulgaria
Radio in Bulgaria
Organizations based in Sofia